Philipp Engelhard Nathusius, since 1861: von Nathusius (November 5, 1815 in Althaldensleben – August 16, 1872 in Luzern) was a German publisher and founder of a charitable organization in Neinstedt.

Life 
He was a son of the industrialist Johann Gottlob Nathusius. One of his brothers was Hermann von Nathusius. Nathusius grew up at the family estate in Althaldensleben. 1832 he started to work in the Nathusius-porcelain factory. Already as young man he was very interested in literature (his grandmother was the poet Philippine Engelhard). 1836 he met in Berlin Bettina von Arnim; with her he stayed several years in contact. She made him the main character in her novel Ilius Pamphilius und die Ambrosia.

He married 1841 Marie Scheele, later a well known novelist. The couple established 1847 a first charity home for orphans in Althaldensleben. Later he established a much bigger charitable organization in Neinstedt (today known as the "Neinstedter Anstalten"). 1849 Nathusius became editor in chief of the Volksblatt für Stadt und Land zur Belehrung und Unterhaltung. Since 1861 he acted as publisher of the weekly newspaper. Ten years later his son, Martin von Nathusius, became his successor. Another son was the politician Philipp von Nathusius, and a granddaughter the novelist Annemarie von Nathusius. 1861 Nathusius became ennobled, after several years illness he died 1872 during a convalescence in Switzerland.

Works 
 Fünfzig Gedichte, 1839
 Ulrich von Hutten. Volksthümliche Betrachtungen des gegenwärtigen kirchlichen Streites in Deutschland, 1839
 Noch fünfzig Gedichte, 1841
 Lebensbild der heimgegangenen Marie Nathusius, geb. Scheele, 3 Bände, 1868/69
 Dokumente und Umstände einer nicht zustandegekommenen Claudius-Biographie

References

External links 

 Biography (in German)

1815 births
1872 deaths
19th-century German newspaper publishers (people)
German male writers